James R. Crotty was an American Post-Keynesian macroeconomist whose research in theory and policy attempts to integrate the complementary analytical strengths of the Marxian and Keynesian traditions.  He has made contributions to the social structure of accumulation (SSA) theory; the implications of radical uncertainty for macro theory and theories of financial markets.

Education
Crotty got a degree from Fordham University in 1961 and masters from Carnegie-Mellon University in 1963. Crotty received his Ph.D. from Carnegie Mellon University in 1973.

Career
Crotty did Economist and Operations Research Analyst at Mellon National Bank and Trust Company from 1963 to 1966. He was assistant professor at State University of New York at Buffalo and Bucknell University between 1966–72 and 1972-74 respectively. After teaching at the University at Buffalo, The State University of New York and Bucknell University, he joined the Economics Department of the University of Massachusetts Amherst, Amherst. In June 1974, he became an assistant professor at UMass Amherst. He has held various positions at the university since, apart from a gap between 1977 and 1981. Crotty become professor emeritus at the institution in June 2010.

Analysis
His heterodox analysis of and approach to current economic issues at the global and U.S. scale have provided a dissenting voice in a world heavily dominated by neo-classical and neo-liberal economics.

Recently, Crotty has focused on the political economy of Korea and continues his research on the structure and performance of the global neoliberal economy, the impact of neoliberal globalization on developed and developing economies.

In 2016, he told Institute for New Economic Thinking that Keynes has been misrepresented stating, "When Keynes ended the General Theory with a call for "a more or less comprehensive socialization of investment" and the "euthanasia of the rentier," it wasn't a tossed-off provocation, but a summary of a serious political program developed over decades."

Publications
His writings have appeared in social science journals such as Monthly Review, the American Economic Review, the Review of Radical Political Economics, the Cambridge Journal of Economics, the Quarterly Journal of Economics, the Journal of Economic Literature, the Journal of Post Keynesian Economics, the Journal of Economic Issues, and in many edited collections.

In 2014, Salon magazine used Crotty and Gerald Epstein's research on an article on how in 2006 Goldman Sachs, Morgan Stanley and Bear Stearns made the majority of their profits on 'casino' activities.

Selected works

Papers
 Avoiding another meltdown, with Gerald Epstein, (2009)

Chapters
 How big is too big? On the social efficiency of the financial sector in the United States in Capitalism on Trial, with Gerald Epstein (Edward Elgar Publishing, 2013) 

 The Centrality of Money, Credit and Financial Intermediation in Marx’s Crisis Theory in Rethinking Marxism (Autonomedia, 1985)

References

External links
 Professor Crotty's web page  (includes papers)

Carnegie Mellon University alumni
21st-century American economists
Living people
University of Massachusetts Amherst faculty
1940 births
Fordham University alumni
Writers from the Bronx